In fracture mechanics, the stress intensity factor is used to predict the stress state ("stress intensity") near the tip of a crack or notch caused by a remote load or residual stresses.  It is a theoretical construct usually applied to a homogeneous, linear elastic material and is useful for providing a failure criterion for brittle materials, and is a critical technique in the discipline of damage tolerance.  The concept can also be applied to materials that exhibit small-scale yielding at a crack tip.

The magnitude of  depends on specimen geometry, the size and location of the crack or notch, and the magnitude and the distribution of loads on the material. It can be written as:

Linear elastic theory predicts that the stress distribution near the crack tip, in polar coordinates with origin at the crack tip,  has the form  

Theoretically, as  goes to 0, the stress  goes to  resulting in a stress singularity. Practically however, this relation breaks down very close to the tip (small ) because plasticity typically occurs at stresses exceeding the material's yield strength and the linear elastic solution is no longer applicable. Nonetheless, if the crack-tip plastic zone is small in comparison to the crack length, the asymptotic stress distribution near the crack tip is still applicable.

Stress intensity factors for various modes 

In 1957, G. Irwin found that the stresses around a crack could be expressed in terms of a scaling factor called the stress intensity factor. He found that a crack subjected to any arbitrary loading could be resolved into three types of linearly independent cracking modes. These load types are categorized as Mode I, II, or III as shown in the figure.  Mode I is an opening (tensile) mode where the crack surfaces move directly apart. Mode II is a sliding (in-plane shear) mode where the crack surfaces slide over one another in a direction perpendicular to the leading edge of the crack. Mode III is a tearing (antiplane shear) mode where the crack surfaces move relative to one another and parallel to the leading edge of the crack. Mode I is the most common load type encountered in engineering design.

Different subscripts are used to designate the stress intensity factor for the three different modes.  The stress intensity factor for mode I is designated  and applied to the crack opening mode.  The mode II stress intensity factor, applies to the crack sliding mode and the mode III stress intensity factor, applies to the tearing mode.  These factors are formally defined as:

Relationship to energy release rate and J-integral 
In plane stress conditions, the strain energy release rate for a crack under pure mode I, or pure mode II loading is related to the stress intensity factor by:

The material is assumed to be an isotropic, homogeneous, and linear elastic. The crack has been assumed to extend along the direction of the initial crack

For plane strain conditions, the equivalent relation is a little more complicated:

For pure mode III loading,

where  is the shear modulus.  For general loading in plane strain, the linear combination holds:

A similar relation is obtained for plane stress by adding the contributions for the three modes.

The above relations can also be used to connect the J-integral to the stress intensity factor because

Critical stress intensity factor 

The stress intensity factor, is a parameter that amplifies the magnitude of the applied stress that includes the geometrical parameter  (load type). Stress intensity in any mode situation is directly proportional to the applied load on the material. If a very sharp crack, or a V-notch can be made in a material, the minimum value of  can be empirically determined, which is the critical value of stress intensity required to propagate the crack. This critical value determined for mode I loading in plane strain is referred to as the critical fracture toughness of the material.  has units of stress times the root of a distance (e.g. MN/m3/2). The Mode I critical stress intensity factor, is the most often used engineering design parameter in fracture mechanics and hence must be understood if we are to design fracture tolerant materials used in bridges, buildings, aircraft, or even bells.

Polishing cannot detect a crack. Typically, if a crack can be seen it is very close to the critical stress state predicted by the stress intensity factor.

G–criterion 
The G-criterion is a fracture criterion that relates the critical stress intensity factor (or fracture toughness) to the stress intensity factors for the three modes.  This failure criterion is written as

Examples

Infinite plate: Uniform uniaxial stress

Penny-shaped crack in an infinite domain

Finite plate: Uniform uniaxial stress

Edge crack in a plate under uniaxial stress

Infinite plate: Slanted crack in a biaxial stress field

Crack in a plate under point in-plane force

Loaded crack in a plate

Compact tension specimen

Single-edge notch-bending specimen

See also 
 Fracture mechanics
 Fracture toughness
 Strain energy release rate
 J-integral
 Material failure theory
 Paris' law

References

External links 
  Kathiresan, K. ; Hsu, T. M. ; Brussat, T. R., 1984, Advanced Life Analysis Methods. Volume 2. Crack Growth Analysis Methods for Attachment Lugs
 Stress Intensity Factor on www.fracturemechanics.org, by Bob McGinty

Fracture mechanics